Little Star Journal is a print and online magazine of poetry and prose, established in 2009. The print edition is published annually. Little Star is a self-styled home for serious literature in digital and print culture, for new and established writers.

The magazine is rooted in book culture and the reflective traditions of a number of well-remembered hand-held journals of the past, such as The Criterion, The Partisan Review, Antaeus. It was the agility of digital reproduction and the reach of literary blogging and social networking that prompted editors to frame a print tradition with mixed-media.
 
The magazine takes its name from a line from Joseph Brodsky: "But soon, I’m told, I’ll lose my epaulets altogether / and dwindle into a little star."

History 
Little Star was established by Ann Kjellberg. She was joined by the poet Melissa Green as contributing editor.

Reception
Little Star was reviewed on the blogs of The New Yorker, The Paris Review, The New York Times's T Magazine, USA Today's Character Approved, and Paste. A story by Padgett Powell, Manifesto, was excerpted in the June 2010 issue of Harper's.

References

External links 
 

Poetry magazines published in the United States
Annual magazines published in the United States
English-language magazines
Magazines established in 2009
Magazines published in New York City